Syala is a character in Hindu mythology. He is described to be a Yadava prince who insulted the sage Gargya. He was thus cursed to become the father of Kalayavana, a great enemy of Krishna and the Yadu dynasty.

References

Sources
Dowson's Classical Dictionary of Hindu Mythology

Characters in Hindu mythology